Andrew Waggoner (born November 10, 1960 in New Orleans) is an American composer and violinist.

Biography
Andrew Waggoner grew up in New Orleans, Minneapolis and Atlanta, and studied at the New Orleans Center for Creative Arts, the Eastman School of Music and Cornell University.  His music has been commissioned and performed by the Academy of St. Martin-in-the-Fields, the Los Angeles Philharmonic, the Saint Louis, Denver, Syracuse, and Winnipeg Symphonies, the Cassatt, Corigliano, Miro, and Villiers Quartets, the Pittsburgh New Music Ensemble, the California EAR Unit, pianist Gloria Cheng, violist Melia Watras, ‘cellist Robert Burkhart, the Bohuslav Martinu Philharmonic of Zlin, Czech Republic, Sequitur, the Empyrean Ensemble, Buglisi-Foreman Dance, Ensemble X, CELLO, Flexible Music, Ensemble Nordlys, of Denmark, and Ensemble Accroche Note, of France.

Compositions

String Chamber Works
Down/Up for ob., vn., va., vc. (11′), 2014.
Genome of the Soul, for string quartet, 2 vns., va., vc. (11′), 2009.
My Penelope (String Quartet no. 4), (23′), 2006
Soon, the Rosy-Fingered Dawn, vn., va., vc. (13′), 2006.
Stretched on the Beauty, 4 ‘cellos (8’), 2009.
Third String Quartet (18′), 2003.
Legacy, st. qt. (7′), 1998, recorded by the Corigliano Quartet on CRI/New World
Strophic Variations for String Quartet "A Song", (25′), 1988, recorded by the Cassatt Quartet for CRI/New World.
I Want to Go With the Wolves, for string quartet and antiphonal howling children (6′), 1990.
 Hexacorda Mollia (String Quartet), 2016. Commission for the Smart & Active Matter Conference at Syracuse University. Debuted by the JACK Quartet, June 22, 2016.

Chamber Music with PianoStory of Alice Munro, and dedicated to John and Rosemary Harbison, 2013.Catenary, vc., pf. (11′), 2008.Tales of Home, for piano trio, vn., vc., pf. (12′), 2008.Inventory of Terrors for piano quintet, 2 vns., va., vc., pf. (15′), 2009.Elle s’enfuit (Encore-Fugue for viola and piano), va., pf. (8′), 2003.Livre, vc., pf. (11′), for Caroline Stinson; 2014.Langue et parole, vn., pf. (12′), 2005.Story-Sonata, va., pf. (15′), 2000.

Mixed EnsembleSummer, cl., vn., vc., pf. (9′), 2012.An Oracle Unheard, 10 Dramatic Movements after Herodotus, narr.; cl., vn., vc., va., pf. (25′), 2012.Souffrir/symphonier, fl., ob., 2 gt., vn., vc. (10′), 2015.One Kindness, cl., vn., vc., pf. (14′), 2010.Catena di cuori, fl., pf. (6′), 2008.Exorcist, sax., gt., perc., pf. (12′), 2007.The Desires of Ghosts, fl., cl., vn., va., pf. (9′), 2000.Pierrot Tells the Time… , fl., cl., vn., va., vc., pc., pf. (9′); 1997.Shared Presence (Commune présence), ob., cl., bn., hn., 2 vn., va., vc., pf. (8′), 1999.Going…'' , fl., vn., cbn., cb. (12′), 1988.

Discography
Terror and Memory – Works by Andrew Waggoner performed by Open End, Andrew Waggoner, Ensemble Nordlys, Flexible Music, Corigliano Quartet, Caroline Stinson and Molly Morkoski.   Label: Albany Records. January 2012 
Legacy – Works by Andrew Waggoner performed by Cassatt Quartet, Corigliano Quartet, and others. Label: Composer Recordings. 2001

References

External links 

Living people
1960 births
20th-century classical composers
21st-century classical composers
American male classical composers
American classical composers
Cornell University alumni
Eastman School of Music alumni
Syracuse University faculty
20th-century American male musicians
21st-century American male musicians